Sempervivum marmoreum is a succulent plant in the family Crassulaceae native to south-eastern Europe (Bulgaria, Romania, Greece, North Macedonia, Serbia, etc.) and central Europe (Hungary, Slovakia). Sempervivum marmoreum naturally grows on rocky outcrops  with southern exposure.

Main subspecies
Sempervivum marmoreum subsp. marmoreum (Balkans, Romania)
Sempervivum marmoreum subsp. blandum
Sempervivum marmoreum subsp. matricum (Hungary, Slovakia, Transylvania)
Sempervivum marmoreum subsp. reginae-amaliae

References

marmoreum